James Lyster O'Beirne (1820 – 1895) was an Irish Liberal politician.

He was elected as the Member of Parliament (MP) for Cashel at the 1865 general election and held the seat until 1869, when his victory at the 1868 general election was declared void on account of bribery The seat was then disenfranchised and absorbed into Tipperary.

References

External links
 

1820 births
1895 deaths
Irish Liberal Party MPs
Members of the Parliament of the United Kingdom for County Tipperary constituencies (1801–1922)
UK MPs 1865–1868
UK MPs 1868–1874